Pier Alberto Testoni (born 11 April 1950) is an Italian fencer. He competed in the individual épée event at the 1972 Summer Olympics.

References

External links
 

1950 births
Living people
Italian male fencers
Olympic fencers of Italy
Fencers at the 1972 Summer Olympics
20th-century Italian people
21st-century Italian people